Salah Tarif (born 9 February 1954) is a Druze Israeli politician who served as a member of the Knesset between 1992 and 2006. When appointed Minister without Portfolio by Ariel Sharon in 2001, he became Israel's first non-Jewish government minister.

Biography
Born in the Druze village of Julis, Tarif is the grandson of Sheikh Amin Tarif.

Tarif served in the paratrooper and tank units of the IDF, before graduating from the University of Haifa with a BA. Whilst at university he served as deputy chairman of the student union.

Tarif later became mayor of Julis, and chaired the board of Druze and Circassian mayors. A member of the Labor Party, he was on the Alignment list (largely composed of Labor Party members) for the 1988 Knesset elections. Although he failed to win a seat, he entered the Knesset on 3 February 1992 as a replacement for Ezer Weizman. He retained his seat in the June 1992 elections, and in November 1995 was appointed Deputy Minister of Internal Affairs in Shimon Peres' government. He was re-elected in 1996, after which he was appointed Deputy Speaker of the Knesset.

He was re-elected in 1999 (in which Labor ran under the One Israel umbrella), and in 2001 was appointed a Minister without Portfolio in Ariel Sharon's national unity government, making him the first non-Jew to hold a full ministerial position. However, he left the cabinet in January 2002 when he resigned following the decision to prosecute him on charges of bribery and breach of trust, though he did remain a Knesset member.

He lost his seat in the 2003 elections as Labour won only 19 seats, but re-entered the Knesset in November 2005 as a replacement for Amram Mitzna who resigned to take over as mayor of Yeruham. In January 2006 Tel Aviv district court upheld his conviction on these charges and in March he lost his seat again following fresh elections.

See also 
 List of Israeli public officials convicted of crimes
Mowafak Tarif, spiritual leader of the Druze in Israel and the grandson of Sheikh Amin Tarif

References

External links

Jewish News Weekly - Not all Israeli Arabs cheer Druze leader

1954 births
Living people
Alignment (Israel) politicians
Deputy ministers of Israel
Deputy Speakers of the Knesset
Druze members of the Knesset
Israeli Druze
Government ministers of Israel
Israeli government officials convicted of crimes
Israeli Labor Party politicians
Israeli people convicted of bribery
Israeli politicians convicted of corruption
Israeli politicians convicted of crimes
Mayors of local councils in Israel
Members of the 12th Knesset (1988–1992)
Members of the 13th Knesset (1992–1996)
Members of the 14th Knesset (1996–1999)
Members of the 15th Knesset (1999–2003)
Members of the 16th Knesset (2003–2006)
One Israel politicians
People from Julis
University of Haifa alumni